Meiko may refer to:

 Meiko (given name)
 Meiko (American singer), born 1982, American singer-songwriter
 Meiko (album), her self-titled album
 Meikō Line, Nagoya Municipal Subway, Japan
 Meiko Nishi Ohashi roadway bridges, Nagoya, Japan
 Meiko Scientific, defunct British supercomputer manufacturer
 Meiko Maschinenbau, dishwashers manufacturer
 Meiko (software), a Japanese Vocaloid from Crypton Future Media and voiced by Meiko Haigō